Lird may refer to:
 Lird, Gilan
 Lird, alternate name of Poshteh Hir, Gilan Province
 Lird, Hormozgan